The 2011 Lakeside World Professional Darts Championship was the 34th World Championship organised by the British Darts Organisation, and the 26th staging at the Lakeside Country Club at Frimley Green. Martin Adams was the defending men's champion, having won the title for the second time in the previous year's final against Dave Chisnall.

Adams became the first to successfully defend his BDO title since Raymond van Barneveld in 1999, as he beat Dean Winstanley, who is one of only a handful of players to reach the final at their first attempt. The final score was 7–5 in sets which saw Martin Adams retain the championship. Trina Gulliver successfully defended her Women's world title having beaten Rhian Edwards in a repeat of the 2010 final. It was Gulliver's ninth title.

Arguably the two standout matches of the tournament were Adams's victory over John Walton in the second round - the match going all the way to a sudden death leg - and Jan Dekker's comeback victory over Garry Thompson which was reminiscent of Chris Mason's comeback against Adams twelve years earlier (much like Adams in that match, Thompson missed nine darts at double to reach the semi-final).

Players from around the globe competed to reach the BBC televised finals, which run from 1–9 January at Frimley Green.

Format and qualifiers

Men's
The televised stages featured 32 players. The top 16 players in the Lakeside Table over the 2009/10 season were seeded for the tournament. Other places were made up of other qualifiers from the Lakeside Table, a number of qualifying spaces from the International Qualifiers (held in Hull on 28 October), and spaces for the 2008 & 2009 champions and 2010 semi-finalists if not already qualified and still eligible for the tournament. The draw took place on 12 November.

Women's
The televised stages featured 8 players. The top 4 players in the Lakeside Table over the 2009/10 season will be seeded for the tournament. Other places were made up of other qualifiers from the Lakeside Table, a number of qualifying spaces from the International Qualifiers ( held in Hull on 28 October), and spaces for the 2008 & 2009 champions and 2010 finalists if not already qualified and eligibled for the tournament. The draw took place on 12 November.

Prize money

Men's Champion: £100,000
Runner-Up: £30,000
Semi-Finalists (2): £11,000
Quarter-Finalists (4): £6000
Last 16 (8): £4250
Last 32 (16): £3000

There was also a shared 9 Dart Checkout prize of £52,000, along with a High Checkout prize of £3000.

Women's Champion: £10,000 (up from £6,000)
Runner-Up: £2,000
Semi-Finalists (2): £1,000
Quarter-Finalists (4): £500

The total prize fund was £329,000 – a £4000 increase on last year. All levels of prize money remained the same as 2010 (except for the Ladies winner).

Draw

Men's
 Match distances in sets are quoted in brackets at the top of each round. All sets best of five legs, unless there is a final set tie-break.

Women's
 All matches best of three sets, best of five legs.

Television coverage

The tournament was again broadcast by BBC Sport, who have done so every year since its inception. Colin Murray reprised his role as host, after taking over from Ray Stubbs in 2010, Bobby George was again the main pundit, hosting with Colin Murray for live and afternoon coverage sometimes joining Rob Walker for the highlight shows, Bobby George has been the BBC main darts pundit since the early 2000s.  Rob Walker, the Master of Ceremonies at BBC's snooker events and host of the BBC's 2009 Winmau World Masters continued to present the late night highlights and Darts Extra through the night on BBC2.

The commentary team was headed by David Croft, who has been commentating for the BBC since 2003 and Vassos Alexander, making his Lakeside debut covering for the ill Tony Green. Guest commentators included Martin Adams and Tony O'Shea.

Most of the weekend coverage was shown live on either BBC One or BBC Two, included both semi finals and the final itself. All other matches were shown live via the BBC's interactive coverage on its Red Button service.

References

External links
 The official site of the Lakeside BDO World Professional Darts Championship

BDO World Darts Championships
BDO World Darts Championship
BDO World Darts Championship
BDO World Darts Championship
BDO World Darts Championship
Frimley Green
Sport in Surrey